Spill. En damroman (lit. Spill. A Lady's Novel) is a 2010 novel by Swedish author Sigrid Combüchen. It won the August Prize in 2010.

References

2010 Swedish novels
Swedish-language novels
August Prize-winning works